Gestel is a railway station in Gestel, Brittany, France. The station was opened on 8 September 1863, and is located on the Savenay–Landerneau railway. Today, the station is served by TER (local) services operated by the SNCF.

Train services

The station is served by regional trains to Quimper, Lorient and Vannes.

References

TER Bretagne
Railway stations in France opened in 1863
Railway stations in Morbihan